Martina Navratilova defeated the defending champion Chris Evert in the final, 6–3, 6–1 to win the women's singles tennis title at the 1984 French Open. With the win, Navratilova completed a non-calendar-year Grand Slam, dubbed the 'Martina Slam', and became only the second woman in the Open Era to simultaneously hold all four major singles titles (after Margaret Court in 1970). It was Navratilova's second French Open singles title and ninth major singles title overall.

Seeds

Qualifying

Draw

Finals

Top half

Section 1

Section 2

Section 3

Section 4

Bottom half

Section 5

Section 6

Section 7

Section 8

References

External links
1984 French Open – Women's draws and results at the International Tennis Federation

Women's Singles
French Open by year – Women's singles
1984 in women's tennis
1984 in French women's sport